The  is section of the coastline on the Pacific Ocean, located in the southern portion of the city of Hachinohe, Aomori Prefecture, in the Tōhoku region of northern Japan. The coast was  nationally designated a Place of Scenic Beauty in 1937.

Overview
The coastline includes both sandy and rocky beaches, but is for the most part an elevated coastal terrace noted for its grassy meadows and scenic views. 

The area was included within the borders of the Tanesashi Kaigan Hashikamidake Prefectural Natural Park established in 1953. In 2013 the park was incorporated into Sanriku Fukkō National Park.

Samekado Lighthouse, listed as one of the “50 Lighthouses of Japan” by the Japan Lighthouse Association is located on the Tanesashi Coast.

Gallery

See also
 List of Places of Scenic Beauty of Japan (Aomori)
 Tanesashi-Kaigan Station

References

External links

Aomori Prefectural Government

Geography of Aomori Prefecture
Places of Scenic Beauty
Hachinohe
Tourist attractions in Aomori Prefecture